Mullah Jan Mohammad Akhund is an Afghan Taliban politician and military personal who is currently serving as Deputy Commander of the 217 Omari Corps since 14 March 2022. Akhund has also served as Deputy Governor of Takhar Province from 22 November 2021 to 14 March 2022.

References

Living people
Taliban governors
Taliban commanders
Year of birth missing (living people)